Centa San Nicolò is a comune (municipality) in Trentino in the northern Italian region Trentino-Alto Adige/Südtirol, located about  southeast of Trento.

Centa San Nicolò borders the following municipalities: Caldonazzo, Calceranica al Lago, Vattaro, Besenello, and Folgaria.

Demographic evolution

References

Cities and towns in Trentino-Alto Adige/Südtirol